Atterberry is a surname. Notable people with the surname include:

Bo Atterberry (born 1975), American football coach
Derrick Atterberry (born 1972), American football player

See also
 Vanessa Atterbeary (born 1975), American attorney and politician